The following table shows the world record progression in the women's javelin throw. The first world record in the event was recognised by the International Association of Athletics Federations in 1922.
48 world records have been ratified by the IAAF in the event.

Records 1922-1998

Records since 1999

In 1999 a new javelin specification was introduced.

References

Javelin throw,women
Javelin 
Javelin throw
world record